Joe Holland may refer to:

 Joe Holland (American football) (born 1988), American football player
 Joe Holland (skier) (born 1964), American Nordic combined skier
 Joe Holland (coach) (1916–1992), American football, basketball, and baseball coach in the United States
 Joe Holland (baseball), American football and baseball player for the Clemson Tigers; minor league baseball player, baseball coach
 Joe Holland (basketball) (1926–2010), American basketball player
 Joe Holland (footballer) (born 1993), English footballer
 Joseph H. Holland, American politician and businessman from New York, son of Jerome H. Holland
 Joseph R. Holland (born 1936), American politician from New York
 Joseph Holland (actor) (1919–1994), stage and screen actor who was a founding member of the Mercury Theatre
 Joseph Holland (1859–1926), stage and silent screen actor, brother of Edmund Milton Holland
Joe Holland (actor and director) (1961-1994), American actor and director